The Desert Laboratory is a historic biological research facility atop Tumamoc Hill (O'odham: Cemamagĭ Doʼag) at 1675 West Anklam Road in Tucson, Arizona. It was founded by the Carnegie Institution in 1903 to study how plants survive and thrive in the heat and aridity of deserts, and was the first such privately funded effort in the nation.  Beginning in 1906, numerous long term ecological observation areas were set up by Volney Spalding & Forrest Shreve on the  scientific domain of Tumamoc Hill. Nine of these are the world's oldest permanent ecology study quadrats.  The facility and staff were key contributors to what is now considered the science of ecology, including participating in the creation of the Ecological Society of America in 1915 and the Ecology journal.  Led by Spalding & Shreve, they also contributed innovations in conservation.

Part of it was declared a National Historic Landmark in 1965. The rest was added in 1987.

History
Acting on the authority of the Carnegie Institution of Washington, Frederick Vernon Coville Botanist of the USDA and Daniel T. McDougal of the New York Botanical Garden chose Tumamoc Hill as the location of the Desert Laboratory in February, 1903.  It opened in October of that year.

It is now operated by Tumamoc: People & Habitats, part of The University of Arizona's College of Science.

Walking up Tumamoc's Road
The public is welcome to walk up almost to the top of Tumamoc Hill. Walkers must stay on the road. Bicycles and pets are not allowed. And the very top of the Hill is an archaeological site where there is no unsupervised entry. Vehicular traffic restricted to authorized persons.

References

 "Discovering the Desert: The Legacy of the Carnegie Desert Botanical Laboratory" by William G. McGinnies, 276 pp, 1981

External links

 Official Desert Laboratory website
 , with additional surveys of individual buildings Desert Botanical Laboratory, Main Laboratory Building, Tumamoc Hill, Tucson, Pima County, AZ, Desert Botanical Laboratory, Shop Building, Tumamoc Hill, Tucson, Pima County, AZ, Desert Botanical Laboratory, Chemistry Building, Tumamoc Hill, Tucson, Pima County, AZ, Desert Botanical Laboratory, Forest Service Building, Tumamoc Hill, Tucson, Pima County, AZ
 Desert Laboratory Repeat Photography Collection
 NYtimes article about the creation of the laboratory
 JSTOR article
 Harpers Magazine 1911 article (subscribers only)

Buildings and structures in Pima County, Arizona
Sonoran Desert
Buildings and structures completed in 1903
1903 establishments in Arizona Territory
National Register of Historic Places in Tucson, Arizona
National Historic Landmarks in Arizona
Historic American Buildings Survey in Arizona